Zolan Kanno-Youngs is an American journalist based in Washington, D.C. who is the homeland security correspondent for The New York Times. He was previously a reporter for The Wall Street Journal.

Early life and education 
Kanno-Youngs was educated at Cambridge Rindge and Latin School. He graduated from Northeastern University in 2016.

Career 
Kanno-Youngs started his career as an intern and sports reporter at several outlets in 2012 including The Boston Globe and USA Today. He became a reporter covering law enforcement in the New York area for The Wall Street Journal in 2015.

Kanno-Youngs was appointed homeland security correspondent for The New York Times in 2019 as one of the newspaper's lead writers on immigration at the U.S. southern border with Mexico and the Trump administration. He has made numerous appearances on MSNBC and CTV News.

References

External links 
 

21st-century journalists
American political journalists
American sports journalists
The Boston Globe people
Cambridge Rindge and Latin School alumni
Living people
The New York Times people
Northeastern University alumni
USA Today journalists
USA Today people
The Wall Street Journal people
Year of birth missing (living people)